The White Album is the popular name for a 1968 self-titled album by The Beatles.

The White Album may also refer to:

Music 
The White Album (band), a Danish folk and pop band
Dandys Rule OK, a 1995 album by The Dandy Warhols
Fleetwood Mac (1975 album), a self-titled pop/rock album, often referred to as the White Album
Lightning to the Nations, a 1980 album by Diamond Head
The White Album (Hillsong United album), 2014 worship music album
The White Album (Lewis Black album), 2000 comedy album
The White Album (Valensia album), 1994 New-age music album
The White Album (Donnie Vie album), 2014
Weezer (White Album), a self-titled rock album
Avenged Sevenfold (album), a self-titled album by American metal band Avenged Sevenfold

Other uses
The White Album (film), a 2004 documentary starring snowboarder Shaun White
The White Album (book), a 1979 book of essays by Joan Didion
White Album (visual novel), a 1998 Japanese adult visual novel
 White Album, the stand ability of Ghiaccio, an antagonist in the manga series JoJo's Bizarre Adventure

See also
The White Albun, a 2004 rock album by TISM
White (disambiguation)#Arts
The White EP (disambiguation)